During the Parade of Nations portion of the 2004 Summer Olympics opening ceremony, athletes from each country participating in the Olympics paraded in the arena, preceded by their flag. The flag was borne by a sportsperson from that country chosen either by the National Olympic Committee or by the athletes themselves to represent their country.

Parade order
The national team of Greece, as the host nation, entered the stadium last, breaking the tradition that the Greece national team enter first in every Olympic opening ceremony as a tribute for being the original host of both the Ancient and the Modern Olympic Games. However, in a nod to tradition, the Greek flag and flag bearer Pyrros Dimas entered at the beginning of the parade ahead of Saint Lucia, to avoid breaking the tradition entirely. Dimas also led the Greece national team when they entered last. Following tradition, other countries entered the stadium in name order in the language of the host country (Greece), which in this case is Modern Greek.

Kiribati and Timor-Leste competed for the first time at these Olympic Games, whereas Afghanistan returned from its eight-year absence after the national Olympic committee had been suspended under the Taliban regime since 1999.

Announcers in the stadium read off the names of the marching nations in Greek, French, and English (the official languages of the Olympics) with the music, performed and played by Dutch musician Tiësto, accompanying the athletes as they marched into the stadium.

Whilst most countries entered under their short names, a few entered under more formal or alternative names, mostly due to political and naming disputes. The Republic of Macedonia entered as the "Former Yugoslav Republic of Macedonia'" ("Πρώην Γιουγκοσλαβική Δημοκρατία της Μακεδονίας") under Π because of the naming dispute with Greece. The Republic of China (commonly known as Taiwan) entered with the compromised name and flag of "Chinese Taipei" ("Κινεζικη Ταϊπεϊ") under Τ so that they did not enter together with conflicting People's Republic of China (commonly known as China), which entered as the "People's Republic of China" ("Λαϊκή Δημοκρατία της Κίνας") under Κ. The Republic of the Congo entered as just "Congo" (Κονγκό), while the Democratic Republic of the Congo entered with its full name, "Λαϊκή Δημοκρατία του Κονγκό" under Δ. The British Virgin Islands ("Βρετανικές Παρθένοι Νήσοι") entered under Β while the United States Virgin Islands entered as simply the "Virgin Islands" ("Παρθένοι Νήσοι"), under Π. Additionally, Ivory Coast, the United States, Iran, Laos, Libya, Russia, Syria and Hong Kong all entered under their formal names, respectively "Côte d'Ivoire", the "United States of America", "Islamic Republic of Iran", "Lao People's Democratic Republic", "Libyan Arab Jamahiriya", "Russian Federation", "Syrian Arab Republic" and "Hong Kong, China".

Notable flag bearers in the opening ceremony featured the following athletes: triple Grand Slam champion and tennis player Roger Federer (Switzerland), NBA basketball player Yao Ming (People's Republic of China), six-time Olympians and Star sailors Colin Beashel (Australia) and Torben Grael (Brazil), triple Olympic weightlifting champion Pyrros Dimas (Greece), show jumper Ludger Beerbaum (Germany), two-time Olympic sprint freestyle champion Alexander Popov (Russia), four-time rowing champion Elisabeta Lipă (Romania), decathlon champion Erki Nool (Estonia), and rings gymnast Jury Chechi (Italy).

List
The following is a list of each country's announced flag bearer. The list is sorted by the order in which each nation appears in the parade of nations. The names are given in their official designations by the IOC.

See also
 2008 Summer Olympics national flag bearers
 2008 Summer Paralympics national flag bearers
 2010 Winter Olympics national flag bearers

References 

Flag bearers
Lists of Olympic flag bearers